The Polish surname Dunin originated in the 12th century with Piotr Włost Dunin.  He was Palatine of Poland and the castellan of Wroclaw (Silesia), as well as, Brother in law of Duke Bolesław III Wrymouth (Boleslaw Krzywousty).   The coat of arms is the Łabędź (swan). See: Duninowie family.

 Piotr Włostowic, also known as 'Piotr Włost Dunin', a Silesian noble and voivode, adviser of the king of Poland  (1080–1153).
 Princess Mariya (Maria), daughter of Grand Duke Sviatopolk II of Kiev and Olena, daughter of Kuman/Kipchak chief Tugorkhan, she married Piotr Włostowic and co-founded the Dunin family.
 Piotr Dunin (fl. 1462), Polish military hero.
 Marcin Dunin (1774–1842), Archbishop of Poznań and Gniezno (1831–1842)
 Count Stanisław Dunin-Wąsowicz, Polish general, captain of the 1st Polish Lancers and Napoleon's loyal aide-de-camp during his 1812 Russian Campaign.
 Wincenty Dunin-Marcinkiewicz (January 23, 1808 – 1884), Belarusian and Polish writer, poet, dramatist, social activist, humanist, is considered a founder of the New Belarusian Literature.
 Count Rodryg Dunin (1870–1928), Polish agriculturist.
 Count Casimir Dunin-Markiewicz (1874–1932), (also spelled Kazimierz Dunin-Markiewicz) Polish painter.
 Count Antoni Dunin (1907–1939), Polish army officer
 Ron Dunin, (1918–2004), mayor of San Luis Obispo, California from 1985 to 1992
 Elsie Ivancich Dunin (born 1935), Croatian-American dance ethnologist
 Kinga Dunin (born 1954), "a literary critic and Poland's leading feminist", author, and cultural journalist.  Author of Tao of a Housewife (1996) and A Pumpkin Coach (2000).
 Elonka Dunin (born 1958), American cryptographer and game developer
 Rafal E. Dunin-Borkowski (born 1969), director of the Ernst Ruska-Centre for Microscopy and Spectroscopy with Electrons (ER-C) in Forschungszentrum Jülich.

See also 
 Dunn (surname)
 Dunning (surname)

References

Polish-language surnames